Grace is the debut studio album by German singer Mandy Capristo. The album was released on April 27, 2012 under the recordings of EMI, Capitol Records and Starwatch Entertainment. The project is Capristo's first solo release following the disbandment with her band Monrose whom after four years have enjoyed four successful albums and seven consecutive top-ten singles.

Recorded in Hamburg, Cologne and Berlin, Germany, Capristo had mainly collaborated with David Jost, Twin, Lamb, Julie Frost and Will Simms, among others for the album. Upon the release of the album, the album charted debuted at number-eight on the German Albums Chart in the first week.

Background and development

Capristo's first solo album was originally planned to be released in summer 2011, but the singer later stated that the album would not be released during the summer, as she felt that the album was not yet ready to be released, and she wanted to make sure the finished product was something she could be proud of. During the album's recording sessions in 2011, she was asked to record a song with German singer Peter Maffay named "Die Zeit hält nur in Träumen an" (English: "The time stops only in dreams") for the Tabaluga musical. Capristo got the role of "Lilli" for the musical. Their first television performance was on October 8, 2011 on Wetten, dass..?.

In December 2011, Capristo stated on her official Facebook page that her debut album was set to be released in February 2012, while not revealing any further details about the album. She said it was definitely a pop album, but was also mixed. She further elaborated that there were a lot of songs to pick from, but she chose the songs which were 100% "Mandy Capristo" and said that every song on the album she has experienced in her life.

After the collaboration with Peter Maffay, Capristo headed back in the studio and focused on her upcoming album. When asked about the title and concept of her debut album, Capristo said: "The album production was, for me personally, the biggest challenge I have ever mastered. It was the most intense and emotional time of my life. Every tear, every sleepless night and all criticism I put it as an experience in my songs." The title of the album "Grace" came from her middle name. The inspiration for the album came from dance, pop and R&B artists like Beyoncé, Rihanna, Nicole Scherzinger and Destiny's Child. The album mixes pop music with dance, and electro-pop influences. To some extent, even hip-hop, teen pop included, and reggae elements.

In January 2013 Mandy was nominated with her debut album Grace for the biggest German music award Echo in the category Best female rock/pop act - national.

Composition and recording
Capristo confirmed in November 2010 after the disbandment of her band Monrose that she was starting the recording session for her first studio album.

Mandy worked with producers such as David Jost, Toby Gad, Will Simms, Julie Frost, Ruben Rodriguez, Keith 'Elliott' Munnerlyn, Sebastian Henzl, Rino Galiano, Twin, Lamb, Derek McDonald, Debbie French, Pam Sheyne, Pixie Lott, Mark Frisch, Anthony Galatis, David Eriksen, Ina Wroldsen, Robin Grubert, Martin Tingvall, Mathias Wollo, songwriters as Awa Manneh, Sharon Vaughn, Sebastian Thott, Didrik Thott, Shelly Peiken, Greg Wells, Amie Miriello.

The album begins with "Allow Me". This song has rap elements, is an uptempo number and begins with: "My name is Mandy, second name is Grace!" [...] I know I can make it ". The second song of the album is the first single "The Way I Like It", lyrically the song is about sex. In Mandy's eyes, the meaning for her is "to do what you like and what you want". "Overrated" is a mid-tempo song, which has Contemporary R&B influences. The song is about the lonely time as a single person, if you have just "split up with your partner": "I'm on my own - I never thought that I would say this, single life is overrated! Alone is overrated! The message of the next song "Sing" is that all the feelings and pain is to sing from the soul. "Hurricane" is one of the "powerful song" of the album and is about the calm before the storm. The chorus is catchy: "He left me, when he walked away, this love - his love is like a hurricane" striking is the constant change of pace from slow to fast.

"Otherside" is a cover of the Red Hot Chili Peppers, she stated that she covered this song because her brother is a fan of the track from the band, so Capristo decided to cover this song for the album. She revealed "Grace" is her most personal song, which was co-written by herself. The song is dedicated to her family. At the end of the song there are Italian lyrics.

Capristo stated that "It Don't Matter", "Risque", "Hurricane" and "Grace" are her favorite songs.

Reception

Critical reception

Grace received mixed reviews by music critics "Laut.de" gave the album 2 stars out of 5 stars and said: "The best songs are The Way I Like It and "It Don't Matter", but the acoustic-versions are much better. The music magazine Max.de gave the album 3 stars out of 5 stars. They praise the recognition of Capristo's voice. At best these instruments come with a reduced advantage. "Grace" is the new business card of the German-Italian. "CD-Bewertungen" gave the album 7 stars out of 10 stars and praised the variety of the songs and the depth and also Capristo's passion, however, they criticized that there was no distinctive catchy tune. Altogether, her debut is a personal work and has become an interesting start for her solo career, which has just really started.

"MonstersandCritics" gave the album 3 stars out of 6 stars and wrote: "On 'Grace' reign opulent arranged dramas and anxious eroticism instead of authenticity. In pompous ballads like 'Overrated', 'Side Effects' and 'It Do not Matter' suffers Capristo with velvet voice once more the romantic disappointments of her young life."

2live4music gave the album 5 out of 5 stars. The best songs on the album were "Intense", "Hurricane", "Closer", "Overrated" and "Allow Me" with Hurricane being the best track with single- and hitpotential. They praised Mandy's memorable voice and authentic set of songs. They see big potential in the 23-year-old German/Italian, she could become the new Sarah Connor and successfully release singles and albums worldwide.

Singles
The lead single from Grace, "The Way I Like It", which was produced by David Jost, was the released in Germany on April 13, 2012 with the acoustic version. The Way I Like It has, to date charted at number 11 in Germany, 29 in Switzerland and 30 in Austria. It spent three weeks in the top twenty in Germany. To date, the single's music video has received over 510,000 views on MyVideo and the acoustic video has received over 2,000,000 views on YouTube.

The second single from Grace, is Closer, which was announced on Mandy's official Facebook. The single was released on August 31. The song charted at 64 on the German single chart and 73 in Austria

Track listing

Charts

Release history

References

2012 albums